Radio West is an FM radio station based in Western Region, Uganda. It is based in Mbarara with four additional repeaters. The station is owned by the Vision Group.

Radio West's audio stream is available on cable service Azam TV, further expanding Radio West's coverage to Zimbabwe, Malawi, Kenya, and Tanzania.

History
Radio West began broadcasting on 10 April 1999 under the ownership of James R Tumusiime; it was acquired by the Vision Group in 2008. Radio West, along with TV West and the Orumuri News newspaper, moved into new custom-built offices in Mbarara in 2015.

In 2019, the station was tied for second in audience reach, with 4 percent of the audience. The station has been criticized for its pro-government editorial stance.

Notable former presenters 
 Robert Mugabe Kakyebezi, current mayor of Mbarara

References

Radio stations in Uganda
New Vision Group
Radio stations established in 1999
1999 establishments in Uganda